Nell W. Franzen (November 17, 1889 – August 21, 1973) was an American film and stage actress of the silent era. A native of Portland, Oregon, Franzen began her career acting in local theatre. She signed with the Baker Theatre Company and performed in various stage productions, becoming a prolific stage actress in the Pacific Northwest.

She later moved to Los Angeles in 1913 to pursue a career in silent films, signing a contract with the America Film Company. One of her earliest film appearances was in Love and the Law (1913) with Wallace Reid, followed by 1916's Lord Loveland Discovers America, and Embers. Franzen made her final film appearance in 1924 before retiring from acting.

Early life
Nell Franzen was born on November 17, 1889 in Portland, Oregon to John O'Flarrity Franzen and Mary Ellen Coshow. According to the 1930 United States Census, Franzen's father was from Massachusetts, and her mother a native of Missouri. She was the second of two children; she had one older sister, Mae Frances Franzen.

Career

Stage career
She began her career as an actress working in stock theater. She began performing onstage with the Baker Stock Company at their Baker Theatre location in Portland in 1910, under stage director Marshall Farnum.  She appeared in the stage production of The Toyshop in 1908,  and also performed with the Sanford Stock Company in Vancouver, British Columbia.

In 1912, Franzen appeared with the Harry Corson Clarke theatre company in Honolulu, Hawaii.

Films

After moving to Los Angeles to pursue a career in silent films, Franzen toured the world performing for veterans in soldier's camps during World War I alongside fellow silent film star Neva Gerber.

Among her earliest credits was opposite Wallace Reid in Love is the Law (1913). In a 1916 issue of Motography, it was noted: "Nell Franzen, who has been playing minor parts in American film productions, is climbing up in the profession...Miss Franzen won her advancement through the good work done in the small parts given her. She is small and pretty and has a pleasing screen appearance."

Her success with audiences and critics led to larger roles in silent films, most of them with the American Film Company of Santa Barbara, in which she often acted opposite Constance Crawley and Arthur Maude; these roles included parts in Lord Loveland Discovers America (1916) and Embers (1916). She also appeared in the first chapter of the film serial The Diamond from the Sky with Lottie Pickford.

She also continued to work in theatre, performing in a touring one act play titled "Room 13," written by Sherwood MacDonald, opposite Helen Emma Reaume, wife of Tyrone Power. The one-act toured throughout southern California in 1919.

Personal life
According to the California Death Index, she died on August 21, 1973 in Orange, California, at the age of 83. She is interred at Forest Lawn Memorial Park in Glendale, California, alongside her mother, Mary, and sister, Mae.

Credits

Filmography

Stage credits

References

Sources

Further reading

External links

Write-up on Franzen in Motography (1916)

1889 births
1973 deaths
Actresses from Portland, Oregon
American film actresses
American silent film actresses
American stage actresses
Burials at Forest Lawn Memorial Park (Glendale)
20th-century American actresses